Ibrahim Shah Suri was the fifth ruler of the Sur dynasty, a Pashtun (Afghan) dynasty of late medieval northern India.

Reign
He was the governor of Agra in 1555, when he revolted against the sultan. Adil Shah dispatched his army to crush the revolt, but he defeated Adil's army and marched towards Delhi. After capturing Delhi, he assumed the regal title and became Ibrahim Shah Suri. But in the same year, Sikandar Shah Suri defeated him at Farah, 32 km from Agra in spite of the numerical superiority of Ibrahim's army. Sikandar took possession of both Delhi and Agra.

Later days
After losing Delhi and Agra, Ibrahim began his strife with Adil Shah. But he was defeated by Adil's army led by his wazir Hemu twice, first near Kalpi and next near Khanua. He took refuge in the fort of Bayana, but it was besieged by Hemu's army. He got some respite when Hemu was recalled by Adil. Later, Ibrahim constructed a hill fort in Nurpur kingdom in alliance with Bakht Mal and attacked Mughals in Gurdaspur but had to retire at Orissa once Mughals prolonged the siege of Mau Fort, where he died in 1567-68 on arrival.

Notes

Sur Empire
16th-century Indian monarchs
16th-century Indian Muslims
Indian people of Pashtun descent